Philosophical Writings is a postgraduate academic journal of philosophy published by the philosophy department of Durham University. It publishes articles by advanced postgraduates and new academics. The journal is published in printed form only and is indexed in The Philosopher's Index.

External links 
 

Philosophy journals
Publications established in 1996
Triannual journals
English-language journals